Mina Sato (born 7 December 1998) is a Japanese track cyclist.

She won a medal at the 2021 UCI Track Cycling World Championships.

References

External links

1998 births
Living people
Japanese female cyclists
Japanese track cyclists
20th-century Japanese women
21st-century Japanese women